Mary Rita Cooke Greenwood (born April 11, 1943) is a nationally recognized leader in higher education, nutrition, and health sciences. Additionally, her research has been extensively published, internationally recognized, and has earned awards.

Greenwood had served as president of the University of Hawaiʻi and chancellor of the University of California, Santa Cruz. She had held leadership positions in several academic and profession societies and had served in several scientific organizations within the United States government.

She currently holds an appointment as a Distinguished Professor Emerita of Nutrition and Internal Medicine at the University of California, Davis.

Early life and education
Greenwood was born in 1943 in Gainesville, Florida. Greenwood earned the A.B. degree in biology, Summa cum laude, from Vassar College in 1968. She received her Ph.D. in physiology, Developmental Biology, and Neurosciences from Rockefeller University in 1973, and she completed a postdoctoral study in Human Nutrition at Columbia University in 1974.

Career
She is best known for her position as the associate director for Science in the White House Office of Science and Technology Policy (confirmed by the US Senate) during the Clinton Administration. She also served as President of the American Association for the Advancement of Science in 1999. In addition, she has been President of the North American Association for the Study of Obesity (NAASO)—now the Obesity Society; and also President of the American Society of Clinical Nutrition.

Formerly an adjunct professor of Public Health and Nutrition at the University of California, Berkeley, she currently holds an appointment as a Distinguished Professor Emerita of Nutrition and Internal Medicine at the University of California, Davis.

She held various positions in the University of California system: as Provost and Senior Vice President for Academic Affairs, University of California Office of the President; Chancellor of University of California, Santa Cruz; and Dean of Graduate Studies and Vice Provost at University of California, Davis. During her time at chancellor, she oversaw the opening of the University of California system's first new residential college in 30 years. Her tenure oversaw the hiring of 250 new faculty members and academic programs were expanded by 52 percent.

In 2005, the University of California found that Dr. Greenwood had violated its conflict of interest rules related to a management position created for a colleague with whom she co-owned a rental property. The university found no evidence of improper conduct in a second allegation that she influenced a position held by her son at UC Merced, concluding no pattern of impropriety or ethics violations in regard to both matters that were thoroughly investigated. The university accepted Dr. Greenwood's resignation from the position and affirmed her return to the tenured professorship she formerly held at the University of California, Davis.

Greenwood became the President of the University of Hawaiʻi in 2009 and was the first woman to hold the position. During her tenure, she oversaw several major projects including the University of Hawaiʻi Cancer Center, the new University of Hawaiʻi – West Oʻahu campus, the University of Hawaiʻi at Hilo Hawaiian Language and Culture building, the Windward Community College Learning Center, the Maui Community College Science and Technology Center, the Kauaʻi Community College Campus Center project, the University of Hawaiʻi at Mānoa Campus Center and a new Information Technology Building. On May 6, 2013, Greenwood announced her retirement from the University of Hawaiʻi as president.

She is a member of the Institute of Medicine in the National Academy of Sciences, and a fellow of the American Academy of Arts and Sciences.

Awards and fellowships
New York State Regents Fellowship for Graduate Study, 1968     
Matheson Postdoctoral Fellowship, 1973-74
NIH Postdoctoral Fellowship, 1974
Mellon Scholar-in-Residence, St. Olaf College, Northfield, Minn., 1978
NIH Research Career Development Award, 1978-83 
American Institute of Nutrition (AIN) Award in Experimental Nutrition (BioServ Award), 1982
Endowed Chair - John Guy Vassar Chair for Natural Sciences, 1986-89 
Doctor of Humane Letters, Mount Saint Mary College, Newburgh, New York, 1989    
Associate Director for Science, OSTP, The Executive Office of the US president, 1993-1995 
Award of Support of Science Council of Scientific Society Presidents, 1994    
American Psychological Association, Presidential Citation, 1995 
Woman of the Year, Santa Cruz Chamber of Commerce, 1998
Chairman, Board of Directors, American Association for the Advancement of Science, 1999-2000
Woman of Achievement (Education), The Women's Fund, San Jose, 2001
Distinguished Fellow (Science and Technology), California State University, Monterey Bay, 2001 
William D Carey Lecturer, American Association for the Advancement of Science, 2002
The University of California, Santa Cruz Foundation Medal, 2004
Member, California Council on Science and Technology, 2004
American Academy of Arts and Sciences Fellow, 2005
American Association for the Advancement of Science, Past President and Fellow, 1998-1999 & 2005
American Society of Nutrition Fellow, 2009
Member, Board of Governors, East-West Center, 2009- 13
UC Davis College of Agricultural and Environmental Sciences Award of Distinction, 2010
Member, APEC 2011 Hawai‘i Host Committee, 2010-2011
Honorary Doctorate Degree, University of the Ryukyus, 2011                
Woman of Distinction, Girl Scouts of Hawaii, 2011                
Wu Memorial Lecture, Columbia University Institute of Human Nutrition, 2012 
Chair, Council of Presidents, Association of Public and Land-Grant Universities, 2012   
Chair, Hawaii State Childhood Obesity Prevention Task Force, 2012

Publications

References

External links
University of California official faculty synopsis
Greenwood cited in the White House Office of Science and Technology Policy
Greenwood lauded at Vassar
Greenwood profiled on Forbes
Greenwood featured in Condé Nast Portfolio
UH regents select Greenwood as new school president
MRC Greenwood and "A Powerful Coterie of larcenous. . . ." (UH's next system President?)
   Executive compensation at UC: MRC Greenwood and the $871 million dollar secret
Greenwood announces retirement

1943 births
Living people
UC Berkeley School of Public Health faculty
Fellows of the American Association for the Advancement of Science
Vassar College alumni
Columbia University alumni
Members of the National Academy of Medicine
Rockefeller University alumni
University of California, Davis faculty
Chancellors of the University of California, Santa Cruz
Presidents of the University of Hawaii System